Daniel Lang (born 17 May 1992) is a German footballer who plays for FV Illertissen.

External links

 

1992 births
Living people
German footballers
Stuttgarter Kickers players
Stuttgarter Kickers II players
3. Liga players
People from Backnang
Sportspeople from Stuttgart (region)
Footballers from Baden-Württemberg
FV Illertissen players
Association football forwards